Uzair Jaswal is a Pakistani singer-songwriter and actor.

Career 

Uzair started his career at the age of 14. At 16, he wrote his first song and was the lead singer of a band called Scar which performed alternative-rock covers. Some of his popular singles include "Tere Bin", "Jaanvey", "Meree Rooh", "Bolay" and "Yaheen". His tracks "Nindiya Ke Paar" and "Bolay" were featured in the 5th season of Coke Studio. At 21, he was the youngest performer of Coke Studio Pakistan in its first 7 seasons.

Uzair branched out into acting. He has worked in three Pakistani films, namely, Gol Chakkar, Slackistan and Jalaibee. He debuted on Pakistani TV with the drama series Moray Saiyaan on ARY Digital in 2016.

He released his debut album titled "Na Bhulana" in the end of 2016, after a decade of making music. The album contains 11 individual tracks and is titled on the hit song "Na Bhulana" which was also the title track of his drama Moray Saiyaan. He won the award for the "Album of The Year" at the 16th Lux Style Awards for "Na Bhulana".
His drama Shayad is currently airing on Geo Entertainment where he is performing impressively.

Entry in Bollywood
Jaswal made his playback singing debut in the Bollywood film Ek Paheli Leela in 2015. He sang the song titled "Tere Bin Nahi Laage", which was a recreated version of his earlier hit, "Tere Bin". The song was recreated by Amaal Mallik with a few lyrics added by Kumaar for the film.
"Tere Bin" won The Gold Disc Award at the Radio Mirchi Awards in India.yes

Discography

Singles

Bollywood

Filmography

Films

Television

References

External links 

1992 births
Living people
Alumni of University of London Worldwide
Alumni of the University of London
Pakistani male singers
Musicians from Lahore
Pakistani male film actors
Singers from Lahore
21st-century Pakistani male actors
American emigrants to Pakistan